Dhaurehra is a town and a nagar panchayat in Lakhimpur Kheri district  in the state of Uttar Pradesh, India.

Demographics
 India census, Dhaurehra had a population of 18,882. Males constitute 53% of the population and females 47%. Dhaurehra has an average literacy rate of 28%, lower than the national average of 59.5%: male literacy is 34% and, female literacy is 21%. In Dhaurehra, 19% of the population is under 6 years of age.

References

Cities and towns in Lakhimpur Kheri district